Tazaghine (Tarifit: Tazaɣin, ⵜⴰⵣⴰⵖⵉⵏ; Arabic: تزغين or تزاغين) is a commune in Driouch Province of the Oriental administrative region of Morocco. At the time of the 2004 census, the commune had a total population of 5032 people living in 910 households.

References

Populated places in Driouch Province
Rural communes of Oriental (Morocco)